Chief Military Prosecutor Office - the highest organizational unit of the military part of the prosecutor's office in Poland in the hierarchy, existing until April 4, 2016. The last deputy of the Military Prosecutor's Office was Colonel Tadeusz Cieśla.

List of Military Prosecutors 

 Second Polish Republic - In 1919, by the decree of the Chief of State, the structures of the military prosecutor's office were created. The Supreme Military Prosecutor's Office and the superior of the prosecutors of the Supreme Military Prosecutor's Office and prosecutors of other military organizational units of the prosecutor's office became the Chief Military Prosecutor.

2. Polish People's Republic - In 1967, the Military Prosecutor's Office was subordinated to the Prosecutor General. Thus, the Chief Military Prosecutor became the Deputy Public Prosecutor General, and the Public Prosecutor General became the supreme body of the entire prosecutor's office.

3. Poland - The Chief Military Prosecutor was the highest authority in the military part of the prosecutor's office after the Public Prosecutor General, and at the same time a deputy of the Public Prosecutor General. He was the superior of the prosecutors of the Supreme Military Prosecutor's Office and other prosecutors of military organizational units of the prosecutor's office.

References

Military of Poland
Politics of Poland
Law of Poland
Prosecution